Hassan Shalchian (1910 in Tehran - 2000 in Tehran) was an Iranian politician, who served as the Minister of Roads and Transportation from 22 November 1978 to 31 December 1978.

References

1911 births
2001 deaths
Iranian political people
People from Tehran
20th-century Iranian politicians